William Washington Beaudine (January 15, 1892 – March 18, 1970) was an American film actor and director. He was one of Hollywood's most prolific directors, turning out films in remarkable numbers and in a wide variety of genres.

Life and career
Born in New York City, Beaudine began his career as an actor in 1909 with American Mutoscope and Biograph Company. He married Marguerite Fleischer in 1914 and they stayed married until his death. Her sister was the mother of actor Bobby Anderson. Beaudine's brother Harold Beaudine was a director of short action-filled comedy films.

In 1915 he was hired as an actor and director by the Kalem Company. He was an assistant to director D.W. Griffith on The Birth of a Nation and Intolerance. By the time he was 23 Beaudine had directed his first picture, a short called Almost a King (1915). He would continue to direct shorts exclusively until 1922, when he shifted his efforts into making feature-length films.

Beaudine directed silent films for Goldwyn Pictures (before it became part of MGM), Metro Pictures (also before MGM), First National Pictures, Principal and Warner Brothers. In 1926 he made Sparrows, the story of orphans imprisoned in a swamp farm starring Mary Pickford, and The Canadian, based upon a W. Somerset Maugham play and shot on location in Alberta with Thomas Meighan as the lead. Beaudine had at least 30 pictures to his credit before the sound era began. Among his first sound films were short Mack Sennett comedies; he made at least one film for Sennett while contractually bound elsewhere, resulting in his adopting the pseudonym "William Crowley." He would occasionally use the pseudonym in later years, usually as "William X. Crowley."

He ground out several movies annually for Fox Films, Warner Brothers, Paramount, and Universal Pictures. His most famous credits of the early 1930s are The Mad Parade (1931), starring Evelyn Brent in the only World War I battlefield drama with an all-female cast (though men are occasionally heard and parts of their bodies are seen), Three Wise Girls (1932), Jean Harlow's first starring film, and The Old-Fashioned Way (1934), a comedy about old-time show folks starring W. C. Fields.

Beaudine was one of a number of experienced directors (including Raoul Walsh and Allan Dwan) who were brought to England from Hollywood in the 1930s to work on what were in all other respects very British productions. Beaudine directed four films there starring Will Hay, including Boys Will Be Boys (1935) and Where There's a Will (1936), and the George Formby comedy Feather Your Nest (1937).

Beaudine returned to America in 1937 and had trouble re-establishing himself at the major studios. Once widely known as an A-list director of important productions, Beaudine had commanded a premium salary in the late 1920s that Hollywood producers of the late 1930s didn't want to match. He worked briefly at Warner Brothers, with whom he had been associated in Britain, and then waited for offers on his terms. They never came. Beaudine had lost much of his personal fortune through no fault of his own (a bank he bought an interest in had failed, and much of his income was claimed by the British government in taxes).

In 1940 publicist-turned-producer Jed Buell approached Beaudine to direct an all-black-cast feature for Buell's Dixie National Pictures. The salary was a flat $500 for one week's work. Beaudine knew that if he accepted this job, he would henceforth be associated with low-budget films and would never command his old salary again, but with his finances at a low ebb Beaudine accepted the assignment.

Buell was pleased with Beaudine's professionalism and inventive ways to maximize a shoestring budget. He hired Beaudine to direct Misbehaving Husbands (1940), noteworthy at the time as the comeback feature of silent-screen clown Harry Langdon. It was a humble comeback for both Langdon and Beaudine, since it was released by the tiny Producers Releasing Corporation, whose budgets seldom ventured beyond five figures, but it was successful and reestablished both Langdon and Beaudine, albeit in B pictures.

William Beaudine became a low-budget specialist, forsaking his artistic ambitions in favor of strictly commercial film fare, and recouping his financial losses through sheer volume of work. He made dozens of comedies, thrillers and melodramas with such popular personalities as Bela Lugosi, Ralph Byrd, Edmund Lowe, Jean Parker, and The East Side Kids. He became a fixture at the ambitious Monogram Pictures, and directed fully half of the 48 comedy features starring The Bowery Boys. By this time Beaudine had a reputation for being a resourceful, no-nonsense director who could make feature films in a matter of days, sometimes as few as five. He occasionally directed special-interest productions, like the 1945 crusade-for-sex-education feature Mom and Dad, produced by Kroger Babb, and the 1950 religious drama Again Pioneers, produced by the Protestant Film Commission.

In their book The Golden Turkey Awards, Michael and Harry Medved put William Beaudine on their list of worst directors of all time. They gave him the unflattering nickname "One-Shot," because he always seemed to shoot just one take, regardless of actors flubbing their lines or special effects malfunctioning. It is true that Beaudine shot economically—he usually had no choice—but he was always professional, and actually did shoot multiple takes of movie scenes. (The coming-attractions trailers of Beaudine's films are rife with alternate takes.)  The 1959 book Classics of the Silent Screen: A Pictorial Treasury (credited to Joe Franklin but actually written by noted film historian William K. Everson) remarks on "what a really fine director William Beaudine was in the silent era, long before he became the principal director of The Bowery Boys "B" comedies".

Beaudine was often entrusted with series films, including the Torchy Blane, The East Side Kids, Jiggs and Maggie, The Shadow, Charlie Chan and The Bowery Boys series. His efficiency was so well known that Walt Disney hired him to direct some of his television projects of the 1950s and had him direct a feature western, Ten Who Dared (1960). Beaudine became even busier in TV, directing Naked City, The Green Hornet, and dozens of Lassie episodes.

His last two feature films, both released in 1966, were the horror-westerns Billy the Kid vs. Dracula (with John Carradine) and Jesse James Meets Frankenstein's Daughter. By the end of the decade he was the industry's oldest working professional, having started in 1909.

The Academy Film Archive has preserved three films directed by William Beaudine: Little Annie Rooney, Mom and Dad, and A Husband in Haste.

Death
Beaudine died of uremic poisoning in 1970 in California and was interred in the Hollywood Forever Cemetery in Hollywood.

Selected filmography
The following is a listing of the theatrically released, feature-length films directed by William Beaudine. Short subjects and television productions are not included.

1910s
 Almost a Wild Man (1913)

1920s

 Watch Your Step (1922)
 Catch My Smoke (1922)
 Heroes of the Street (1922)
 Her Fatal Millions (1923)
 Penrod and Sam (1923)
 The Printer's Devil (1923)
 The Country Kid (1923)
 Boy of Mine (1923)
 Daring Youth (1924)
 Wandering Husbands (1924) a.k.a. Love and Lies
 Daughters of Pleasure (1924) a.k.a. Beggars on Horseback
 A Self-Made Failure (1924) a.k.a. The Goof
 Cornered (1924)
 Lover's Lane (1924) unconfirmed
 The Narrow Street (1925)
 A Broadway Butterfly (1925)
 How Baxter Butted In (1925)
 Little Annie Rooney (1925)
 That's My Baby (1926)
 Sparrows (1926)
 The Social Highwayman (1926)
 Hold That Lion (1926)
 The Canadian (1926)
 Frisco Sally Levy (1927)
 The Life of Riley (1927)
 The Irresistible Lover (1927)
 The Cohens and the Kellys in Paris (1928)
 Heart to Heart (1928)
 Home, James (1928)
 Do Your Duty (1928)
 Give and Take (1928)
 Fugitives (1929)
 Two Weeks Off (1929)
 Hard to Get (1929) a.k.a. Classified
 The Girl from Woolworth's (1929)
 Wedding Rings (1929) a.k.a. The Dark Swan

1930s

 Those Who Dance (1930)
 Road to Paradise (1930)
 Father's Son (1931)
 Misbehaving Ladies (1931)
 The Lady Who Dared (1931)
 The Mad Parade (1931) a.k.a. Forgotten Women
 Penrod and Sam (1931)
 Men in Her Life (1931)
 Three Wise Girls (1932)
 Make Me a Star (1932)
 The Crime of the Century (1933)
 Her Bodyguard (1933)
 The Old Fashioned Way (1934)
 Two Hearts in Harmony (1935)
 So You Won't Talk (1935)
 Dandy Dick (1935)
 Boys Will Be Boys (1935)
 Get Off My Foot (1935)
 Mr. Cohen Takes a Walk (1935)
 Where There's a Will (1936)
 Educated Evans (1936)
 It's in the Bag (1936)
 Windbag the Sailor (1936)
 Feather Your Nest (1937)
 Said O'Reilly to McNab (1937)
 Take It from Me (1937)
 Torchy Gets Her Man (1938)
 Torchy Blane in Chinatown (1939)

1940s

 She Done Him Right (1940)
 Four Shall Die (1940) a.k.a. Condemned Men
 Misbehaving Husbands (1940)
 Up Jumped the Devil (1941)
 Emergency Landing (1941)
 Federal Fugitives (1941) a.k.a. International Spy
 Desperate Cargo (1941)
 Mr. Celebrity (1941)
 The Miracle Kid (1941)
 Blonde Comet (1941)
 Duke of the Navy (1942)
 Broadway Big Shot (1942)
 Lucky Ghost (1942) a.k.a. Lady Luck
 Professor Creeps (1942)
 The Panther's Claw (1942)
 Men of San Quentin (1942)
 Gallant Lady (1942) a.k.a. Prison Girl
 One Thrilling Night (1942)
 Phantom Killer (1942)
 Foreign Agent (1942)
 The Living Ghost (1942)
 The Ape Man (1943)
 Clancy Street Boys (1943)
 Spotlight Scandals (1943) a.k.a. Spotlight Revue (reissue title)
 Ghosts on the Loose (1943)
 Here Comes Kelly (1943)
 Mr. Muggs Steps Out (1943)
 Mystery of the 13th Guest (1943)
 What a Man! (1944)
 Voodoo Man (1944)
 Hot Rhythm (1944)
 Detective Kitty O'Day (1944)
 Follow the Leader (1944)
 Leave It to the Irish (1944)
 Oh, What a Night (1944)
 Shadow of Suspicion (1944)
 Bowery Champs (1944)
 Crazy Knights (1944) a.k.a. Murder in the Family (TV title)
 Mom and Dad (1945)
 Adventures of Kitty O'Day (1945)
 Fashion Model (1945)
 Blonde Ransom (1945)
 Swingin' on a Rainbow (1945)
 Come Out Fighting (1945)
 Black Market Babies (1945)
 Girl on the Spot (1946)
 The Face of Marble (1946)
 One Exciting Week (1946)
 Don't Gamble with Strangers (1946)
 Below the Deadline (1946) a.k.a. Jumping Joe (TV title)
 Spook Busters (1946)
 Mr. Hex (1946)
 Philo Vance Returns (1947) a.k.a. Infamous Crimes (TV title)
 Hard Boiled Mahoney (1947)
 Too Many Winners (1947)
 Killer at Large (1947) a.k.a. Gangway for Murder and Syndicated Murder
 Gas House Kids Go West (1947)
 News Hounds (1947)
 Bowery Buckaroos (1947)
 The Chinese Ring (1947)
 Angels' Alley (1947)
 Jinx Money (1948)
 The Shanghai Chest (1948)
 The Golden Eye (1948)
 Smugglers' Cove (1948)
 Incident (1948)
 Kidnapped (1948)
 Jiggs and Maggie in Court (1948)
 The Feathered Serpent (1948)
 The Lawton Story (1949)
 Tuna Clipper (1949)
 Forgotten Women (1949)
 Trail of the Yukon (1949) as William X. Crowley
 Jiggs and Maggie in Jackpot Jitters (1949)
 Tough Assignment (1949)

1950s

 Blue Grass of Kentucky (1950)
 Blonde Dynamite (1950)
 Jiggs and Maggie Out West (1950)
 Lucky Losers (1950)
 County Fair (1950)
 Second Chance (1950)
 Blues Busters (1950)
 Again Pioneers (1950)
 A Wonderful Life (1951)
 Bowery Battalion (1951)
 Cuban Fireball (1951)
 Ghost Chasers (1951)
 Let's Go Navy! (1951)
 Havana Rose (1951)
 Crazy Over Horses (1951)
 The Congregation (1951)
 Rodeo (1952)
 Hold That Line (1952)
 Jet Job (1952)
 Here Come the Marines (1952)
 The Rose Bowl Story (1952)
 Bela Lugosi Meets a Brooklyn Gorilla (1952)
 Feudin' Fools (1952)
 No Holds Barred (1952)
 Jalopy (1953)
 Born to the Saddle (1953)
 Roar of the Crowd (1953)
 Murder Without Tears (1953)
 Yukon Vengeance (1954)
 Paris Playboys (1954)
 Pride of the Blue Grass (1954)
 High Society (1955)
 Jail Busters (1955)
 Westward Ho, the Wagons! (1956)
 Up in Smoke (1957)
 In the Money (1958)

1960s
 Ten Who Dared (1960)
 Billy the Kid Versus Dracula (1966)
 Jesse James Meets Frankenstein's Daughter (1966)

Quotes
"These films are going to be made regardless of who directs them. There's a market for them and the studios are going to continue to make them. I've been doing this long enough, I think I can make them as good or better than anyone else."

See also
Medved, Harry and Medved, Michael. The Golden Turkey Awards. Perigee Books, G.P. Putnam's Sons. New York. 1980. . Pages 171–172.

References

External links

 
 One-Shot Beaudine

Male actors from New York City
American male film actors
Film producers from New York (state)
American male screenwriters
American television directors
Burials at Hollywood Forever Cemetery
Deaths from kidney failure
1892 births
1970 deaths
20th-century American male actors
Film directors from New York City
Horror film directors
Screenwriters from New York (state)
20th-century American male writers
20th-century American screenwriters